Caribbean British may refer to:

 British African-Caribbean people
 British Indo-Caribbean people, residents of the UK who were born on a Caribbean island, and whose ancestors are indigenous to India
 British White Caribbean people, residents of the UK who were born on in the Caribbean or have ancestry there, and whose ancestors originated from Europe.

See also 
 Caribbean Canadian
 Diaspora
 West Indian American